Farhan Mutlaq Saleh al-Jubouri was an Iraqi intelligence officer who served as the head of General Military Intelligence in northern Iraq during the al-Anfal campaign. He was born in the 1940s.

Military career
He served as Head of General Military Intelligence in northern Iraq during the al-Anfal campaign which Sweden, Norway and the United Kingdom officially recognize as genocide. He attained the rank of Maj. General.

Iraqi Special Tribunal
Following the 2003 invasion of Iraq Jubouri was charged by the Iraqi Special Tribunal for war crimes and crimes against humanity committed during the al-Anfal campaign. According to Bassem Mroue writing in The Washington Post on 29 January 2007, Jubouri is rerecorded as saying "People hear that Fahran al-Jubouri ordered executions, that villages were destroyed and that he was behind mass graves. My reputation is ruined. I am innocent of all charges against me". The trial concluded on 24 March 2007, with Jubouri being found guilty and given a life sentence. He appealed his sentence, although it was confirmed in a subsequent verdict.

Jubouri was a defence witness for Ali Hassan al-Majid, also known as "Chemical Ali".

Death
Jubouri died in Al- Kadhimiya prison in Baghdad on 26 or 28 March 2013 at the age of 67. He had been suffering from a chronic illness. He was buried on 1 April in his hometown of Qayyarah in Nineveh Governorate.

References

1940s births
2013 deaths
Iraqi generals
Iraqi soldiers
Iraqi mass murderers

Prisoners who died in Iraqi detention
Iraqi people who died in prison custody